Scinax wandae is a species of frog in the family Hylidae.
It is found in Colombia and Venezuela.
Its natural habitats are moist savanna, subtropical or tropical seasonally wet or flooded lowland grassland, freshwater marshes, intermittent freshwater marshes, pastureland, ponds, irrigated land, seasonally flooded agricultural land, and canals and ditches.

References

wandae
Amphibians of Colombia
Amphibians of Venezuela
Amphibians described in 1971
Taxonomy articles created by Polbot